Hella (born 2 January 1985, Finland) is a Finnish keyboardist and singer. She is best known as the current keyboardist of Finnish metal band Lordi. Hella uses Korg keyboards. She is a big melodic metal fan, and her favorite bands include Behemoth and Children of Bodom. In January 2014, Hella recorded a song with a Finnish band called Postikortteja Helvetistä.

In early 2015, Hella announced that she was pregnant. The band's guitarist, Amen, later confirmed that Hella would be replaced for the summer festivals. In summer 2015, Hella's temporary replacement, Nalle, was seen for the first time at Rovaniemi.

Character 

Hella's monster character in Lordi is a mix of human and doll, Scarbie. She has created her character along with the costume-maker Mr. Lordi. Her character has been described as "Living Doll", "Burned´n´Buried" and "Plastic Chick".

Discography (as Hella)
 Lordi: To Beast or Not to Beast (2013)
 Postikortteja Helvetistä: "Miksi?" (single, 2014)
 Lordi: Scare Force One (2014)
 Lordi: Monstereophonic (Theaterror vs. Demonarchy) (2016)
 Lordi: Sexorcism (2018)
 Lordi: Recordead Live – Sextourcism in Z7 (live, 2019)
 Lordi: Killection (2020)
 Lordi: Lordiversity (2021)
 Lordi: Screem Writers Guild (2023)

References

External links

 Hella page on Lordi.fi
 Hella's interview on LORDI Army

Finnish heavy metal keyboardists
Finnish rock musicians
Lordi members
1985 births
Living people
Masked musicians